Siruthuli is an NGO based in Coimbatore, India which works to rejuvenate the water sources in the city of Coimbatore. Siruthuli means a small drop in Tamil.

Stated objectives
Reviving the heritage of Coimbatore vis-à-vis its traditional water management system
Rainwater harvesting to harness rainwater and de-silt ponds, canals and waterways in disuse to raise the ground water level
Preventing environmental degradation by launching a drive against non-bio degradable wastes
Mass education programmes to provide awareness to the larger community to protect the environment
Institutionalizing waste water management and thereby improving sanitation facilities in the community
Initiating projects for a cleaner and greener environment, like Afforestation drive
To foster inter-community relationship through a wider participation by the community to build up a strong social solidarity

Activities

 Lakes in and around Coimbatore namely, Krishnampathy, Narasampathy, Selvampathy, Kumarasamy, Kurichi Kulam and Periyakulam were desilted and deepened. A Checkdam was also built with help of government funding.  
 With the help of the Coimbatore Municipal Corporation, 150 borewells with recharge pits and filter chambers were constructed to harvest the rainwater from roads and the open spaces. 
 Water hyacinth was removed from Valankulam tank. Siruthuli will take up processing of 100 MT. of organic market waste daily. 
 It also plans to plant and nurture 1000 trees and remove encroachments in Noyyal river.

Awards 
 Amruthavarshini Award from Rotary club of Coimbatore - 2015 
 Bhoomijal Samwardhan Puraskar - 2008 (Ground water Augmentation Award), by Union Ministry of Water Resources

References

External links
 `Project Siruthuli' looking at power or manure
 Reviving the tanks

Environmental organisations based in India
Organisations based in Coimbatore
Water in India
Organizations with year of establishment missing